ici was an alternative weekly French language magazine distributed in print in Montreal, Quebec, and online through the Canoe.ca network from 1997 to 2009.

It had an audience of 89,000 readers a week. On April 29, 2009, Quebecor Media announced that it would cease publication of the magazine, with the last issue being published on April 30, 2009. It would live on as ici Week-end, a weekly insert in 24H and on its website.

See also
List of magazines in Canada

References

1997 establishments in Quebec
2009 disestablishments in Quebec
Alternative magazines
French-language magazines published in Canada
Defunct magazines published in Canada
Local interest magazines published in Canada
Magazines published in Montreal
Magazines established in 1997
Magazines disestablished in 2009
Newspaper supplements
Weekly magazines published in Canada